Daniel Labila Eyumpel (born 30 April 2003) is a French professional footballer who plays as a forward for Liga Portugal 2 club Académico de Viseu, on loan from Bundesliga club Hoffenheim.

Career

Early career
Labila is a youth product of Paris Saint-Germain (PSG), having played in the academy of the club from 2016 to 2021. He had previously played for youth teams of Créteil. In the 2019–20 season with the under-17 squad of PSG, Labila scored 19 league goals. In April 2021, it was reported that Labila had rejected a professional contract at Paris Saint-Germain, with his “aspiring” youth contract coming to an end in June.

On 21 July 2021, Labila signed for Belgian club Standard Liège. He joined the under-21 reserve side of the club. PSG retained a percentage to a future sale of Labila.

Hoffenheim 
On 26 July 2022, Hoffenheim announced that Labila had joined the club. To release him from his contract, Standard Liège was promised a percentage to a future sale.

Loan to Académico de Viseu 
Following his arrival at Hoffenheim, Labila was immediately loaned out to Liga Portugal 2 club Académico de Viseu for the 2022–23 season. On 9 November 2022, he made his debut for the club in a 3–0 Taça de Portugal victory over Camacha, and scored the final goal of the match. On 16 January 2023, Labila made his league debut for Académico de Viseu as a late-match substitute in a 1–1 draw against Feirense.

Personal life 
Born in France, Labila is of DR Congolese descent.

Career statistics

References

External links 
 
 

2003 births
Living people
French footballers
Association football forwards
US Créteil-Lusitanos players
Paris Saint-Germain F.C. players
Standard Liège players
TSG 1899 Hoffenheim players
Académico de Viseu F.C. players
Liga Portugal 2 players
French expatriate footballers
Expatriate footballers in Belgium
French expatriate sportspeople in Belgium
Expatriate footballers in Germany
French expatriate sportspeople in Germany
Expatriate footballers in Portugal
French expatriate sportspeople in Portugal